Kevin Nahin Álvarez Campos (born 15 January 1999) is a Mexican professional footballer who plays as a right-back for Liga MX club Pachuca and the Mexico national team.

International career

Youth
In April 2019, Álvarez was included in the 21-player squad to represent Mexico at the U-20 World Cup in Poland.

Álvarez was called up by Jaime Lozano to participate with the under-23 squad at the 2019 Pan American Games, with Mexico winning the third-place match.

Senior
On 3 July 2021, Álvarez made his senior national team debut in a friendly match against Nigeria.

In October 2022, Álvarez was named in Mexico's preliminary 31-man squad for the 2022 FIFA World Cup, and in November, he was ultimately included in the final 26-man roster.

Career statistics

Club

International

Honours
Pachuca
Liga MX: Apertura 2022

Mexico U23
Pan American Bronze Medal: 2019

Individual
Liga MX Best XI: Guardianes 2021, Clausura 2022
Liga MX Best Full-back: 2021–22
Liga MX All-Star: 2021, 2022

References

1999 births
Living people
Mexico youth international footballers
Mexico international footballers
Association football defenders
C.F. Pachuca players
Liga MX players
Liga Premier de México players
Tercera División de México players
Footballers from Colima
Mexican footballers
People from Colima City
Pan American Games medalists in football
Pan American Games bronze medalists for Mexico
Footballers at the 2019 Pan American Games
Medalists at the 2019 Pan American Games
2021 CONCACAF Gold Cup players
Mexico under-20 international footballers
2022 FIFA World Cup players